Anna "Big Annie" Klobuchar Clemenc (March 2, 1888 – July 27, 1956; pronounced "Clements") was an American labor activist. Born in Calumet, Michigan, she founded and served as president of the local Women's Auxiliary No. 15 of the Western Federation of Miners and was an active participant in the Copper Country Strike of 1913–1914. She is an inducted member of the Michigan Women's Hall of Fame.

Biography
Clemenc was born in 1888 in Calumet, Michigan, to George and Mary (née Adam) Klobuchar, the eldest of five children. In 1890 or 1891, the family returned to Slovenia, where the youngest Klobuchar sibling, Mary, was born on February 2, 1892. They lived in George Klobuchar's home village of Dobliče near Črnomelj. Mary Adam Klobuchar was from Dolnja Paka, also near Črnomelj.

In the United States, George was employed in one of the Calumet and Hecla mines and Mary was a domestic worker.

Education
Annie Klobuchar graduated from the eighth grade at a school operated by the Calumet and Hecla Mining Company. She then began working with a local church giving aid to crippled miners and assisted her family financially by doing laundry. Because of her  height, Clemenc was commonly known as "Big Annie" and less commonly as "Tall Annie".

First marriage
At age eighteen, Anna married a Slovene miner, Joseph Clemenc. Following Joseph's repeated physical abuse of Anna and marital discord related to Joseph's alcoholism, the couple divorced around 1914.

Labor activism
In February 1913, Clemenc spearheaded the formation of the Women's Auxiliary No. 15 of the Western Federation of Miners in Calumet. On July 23, a miners' strike was called in Michigan's Copper Country. Clemenc frequently led marches in support of the miners wearing a plain gingham dress and carrying a large American flag on a ten-foot pole. In August, Clemenc led the funeral procession for Alois Tijan and Steve Putrich who died in the Seeberville Affair. On September 10, Clemenc and five other women stopped a man from going to work, whom they mistakenly believed to be a non-striker, and were arrested after fighting with deputies.

Clemenc was elected president of the auxiliary by December 1913.

Italian Hall disaster

Five months into the strike, Clemenc and the Women's Auxiliary planned a Christmas party to be held at Italian Hall in Calumet on December 24. About 500 children and 175 parents were in attendance in the second-floor hall when a false cry of "fire" was heard, leading to a stampede down the main staircase in what became known as the Italian Hall disaster. Over 75 died, most of them children. Carrying her flag, Clemenc led the funeral procession for the victims.

In January 1914, Clemenc served a ten-day jail sentence for previously assaulting a non-striking miner. In February and March, she went on a lecture tour of the Midwest to raise funds for survivors of the Italian Hall disaster and to encourage workers to unionize.

Later life
After the tour, she moved to Chicago and married Frank Shavs. At the age of 26, she gave birth to her only child, Darwina, who later lost her left arm in an automobile accident. Frank became a "drunkard and a wife-beater"., and the couple was divorced. In 1936, she married Andrew Robleck; two years later, this marriage also ended in divorce.

For a time Anna worked two jobs making hats, Little else is known of her later life. She died of cancer in Chicago in 1956, at the age of 68.

Legacy
Contemporary accounts of Clemenc referred to her as an "American Joan of Arc".  Her legacy was largely forgotten until the 1970s. The Michigan House of Representatives described her as "one of Michigan's most valiant, yet largely forgotten and unrecognized, women." June 17, 1980, was declared Annie Clemenc day in Michigan.

A portrait of Clemenc with her flag was commissioned by the Michigan Women's Studies Association and painted by Andy Willis. It was unveiled in the Michigan State Capitol on June 17, 1980, and later transferred to the Michigan Women's Hall of Fame. She was the first person nominated for the Michigan Women's Hall of Fame, was inducted in 1996, and is one of three women included on the Hall of Fame medallion.

A sign commemorating her induction into the Michigan Women's Hall of Fame stood at the site of the now-demolished Italian Hall, but it was removed at some point.

Annie Clements is the lead character in a historical novel by Mary Doria Russell, The Women of the Copper Country (Atria Books, 2019), about the Calumet copper miners' strike.

Notes

References

Works cited

External links

Image of Anna Clemenc from the Michigan Tech Archives

1888 births
1956 deaths
People from Calumet, Michigan
American trade unionists
American people of Slovenian descent
Deaths from cancer in Illinois
Trade unionists from Michigan
American women trade unionists